Susan Leblanc (born 1973) is a Canadian politician and actor who was elected to the Nova Scotia House of Assembly in the 2017 provincial election. A member of the Nova Scotia New Democratic Party, she represents the electoral district of Dartmouth North.

Early life and education
Leblanc was born in Winnipeg, Manitoba but grew up in Prospect Bay, Nova Scotia. She graduated from University of King's College in 1998 with a bachelor of arts (honours) in theatre and acting.

Career
For 20 years, Leblanc was an actor on stage and film, most notably as one of the
leading members and the artistic director of the Zuppa Theatre Company. In her film career, she was also known as Susan Leblanc-Crawford.

Filmography

Film

Television

Electoral record

References

External links
 

Actresses from Nova Scotia
Actresses from Winnipeg
Canadian artistic directors
Canadian actor-politicians
Canadian film actresses
Canadian stage actresses
Canadian television actresses
Academic staff of the Dalhousie University
Drama teachers
Living people
Nova Scotia New Democratic Party MLAs
Politicians from Winnipeg
University of King's College alumni
Women MLAs in Nova Scotia
20th-century Canadian actresses
21st-century Canadian actresses
21st-century Canadian politicians
21st-century Canadian women politicians
1973 births